Barrier cable is a vehicular or pedestrian restraint system used in parking garages.  It installed along the ramps or around the perimeter of the parking structure.  It consists of a 0.5-inch, 7-wire steel strand which is similar to the strand used in Post-tensioned concrete.

Types
There are three types of barrier cables systems:

Galvanized
Galvanized barrier cable is the most prevalent type of barrier cable used today.  The steel strand is Zinc plated to protect it from corrosion per ASTM A475.

Epoxy-Coated
Epoxy-coated barrier cable is used on occasion for aesthetic purposes.  It is significantly more expensive than galvanized barrier cable.

Plastic-Coated
Plastic-Coated is similar to the steel tendon used in Unbonded post-tensioned concrete.  The only difference is that plastic-coated barrier cable does not have a layer of Post Tension coating ("grease") between the extruded HDPE plastic sheathing and the steel strand.

Anchorage
Depending on parking structure, the barrier cable is installed in rows of several cables.  There are several anchorage and attachment systems to concrete or steel columns.

Specification
The design and installation of the barrier cable system is referenced in the Post-Tensioning Institute's Specification for Seven-Wire Steel Strand Barrier Cable Applications.

Benefits
7-wire Barrier Cable has a high strength-to-weight ratio of the strands and the cables cost less to place than precast panels, traditional cast-in-place or concrete masonry barriers.

References

External links
The Post-Tensioning Institute - An international technical institute dedicated to post-tensioned concrete representing a community of professionals and businesses

Concrete
Building materials
Structural engineering